José Félix Pedrozo Bogarín (21 April 1982 – 15 February 2021) was a Paraguayan footballer who played as a defender.

Death
Pedrozo died in a car accident on 15 February 2021.

References

External links
 

1982 births
2021 deaths
People from San Ignacio, Paraguay
Paraguayan footballers
Association football defenders
Club Sol de América footballers
Club Olimpia footballers
C.D. Antofagasta footballers
Ñublense footballers
San Marcos de Arica footballers
Rangers de Talca footballers
Primera B de Chile players
Chilean Primera División players
Paraguayan expatriate footballers
Paraguayan expatriate sportspeople in Chile
Expatriate footballers in Chile
Paraguayan expatriate sportspeople in Brazil
Expatriate footballers in Brazil
Road incident deaths in Paraguay